Makkari may refer to:

Ahmed Mohammed al-Maqqari, 17th-century Muslim historian
Makkari, Hokkaidō, a village in Japan
Makkari (comics), comic book character

See also
 Macari (disambiguation)